
Gmina Tarnów Opolski, German Gemeinde Tarnau is a rural gmina (administrative district) in Opole County, Opole Voivodeship, in south-western Poland.

Since 2007 the commune, like much of the area, has been officially bilingual in German and Polish, a large German population having remained in the area after it was transferred to Polish control.

Administrative divisions
The commune contains the villages and settlements of Tarnów Opolski, Kąty Opolskie, Kosorowice, Miedziana, Nakło, Przywory, Raszowa and Walidrogi.

Neighbouring gminas
Gmina Tarnów Opolski is bordered by the city of Opole and by the gminas of Chrząstowice, Gogolin, Izbicko and Prószków.

Twin towns – sister cities

Gmina Tarnów Opolski is twinned with:
 Bad Blankenburg, Germany
 Brück, Germany

References

Tarnow Opolski
Opole County
Bilingual communes in Poland